This is a list of notable experimental musicians, in alphabetical order by surname.

A–E 

Mohamed Abdelwahab Abdelfattah – (Egypt) experimental music
Acid Mothers Temple – Experimental psychedelic rock
Arca – (Venezuela) Experimental, Electronic music 
Aphex Twin - IDM, experimental, ambient, glitch
Anaiis – (French) (Senegal) Experimental musician
Alarm Will Sound - chamber orchestra known for performing experimental compositions
Miguel Álvarez-Fernández – experimental radio and sound installations
Giulio Aldinucci – experimental electroacoustic composer
Tori Amos – Alternative, Baroque pop, Experimental
Laurie Anderson – electronic music
Ron Anderson – noise and progressive
Animal Collective – experimental music collective
Frédéric Acquaviva – (France) Experimental music
Robert Ashley – totalist television opera
Cities Aviv – experimental hip-hop, post-genre
Nigel Ayers – (UK) sound art, sound collage, member of Nocturnal Emissions
Derek Bailey – guitarist
Beck – (USA) Anti-folk and experimental music
David Behrman – live electronics
Björk – Alternative, avant-garde, experimental, electronica
Bladee – Cloud rap, experimental pop
Boards of Canada – ambient, downtempo, IDM, electronica
Boredoms – Japanese noise rock
Burkhard Beins – percussion and objects
Kate Bush – Art Pop/Rock, Experimental Rock, Alternative Rock, Baroque pop
Buckethead – guitarist
Butthole Surfers – Alternative rock, Experimental, Avant-Garde
Glenn Branca – guitar, noise ensemble
George Brecht – performance art
Bull of Heaven – minimalism, noise, drone, avant-garde jazz, modern classical
Gavin Bryars – indeterministic orchestration
John Cage – indeterminate music
Can – Krautrock band
Captain Beefheart – avant-garde blues artist.
Charli XCX – experimental pop star.
Cornelius Cardew – British composer
Rhys Chatham – guitar, noise ensemble
Clipping. – experimental hip-hop
Coil – sidereal sound, scrying, hallucinogens, ANS, glitches
Nicolas Collins
Loren Mazzacane Connors
Controlled Bleeding – Paul Lemos
David Cope – composer, computerist
Henry Cowell – (USA) tone clusters and Extended technique
Alvin Curran – found sounds
Current 93 – coined the term "apocalyptic folk"
Chris Cutler – English experimental music composer and percussionist
Dead Air Fresheners – masked, anonymous chance music or indeterminate music ensemble 
Death Grips – experimental hip-hop
Deftones – experimental rock 
Stuart Dempster – reverberant spaces, just intonation, extended trombone techniques
Earl Sweatshirt - Experimental Hip Hop
The Dillinger Escape Plan – experimental metal, mathcore
Arnold Dreyblatt – just intonation
Kevin Drumm – guitarist
Iancu Dumitrescu – composer, founder of Hyperion group dedicated to experimental music
Judy Dunaway
Kyle Bobby Dunn – composer, arranger, experimental guitarist
Trevor Dunn – bassist
Marc Edwards – free jazz
Leif Elggren
Brian Eno – ambient music, algorithmic composition
Experimental Audio Research – ambient, synth/noise
Carolina Eyck – thereminist

F–J 

Jean-Baptiste Favory – musique concrète & electronic
Florian-Ayala Fauna – musician, music producer
FKA Twigs – (UK) musician, songwriter, producer, director
Morton Feldman – composer
Flume – experimental electronic producer
Grimes – experimental electronica, synthpop
The Flying Lizards – (UK) experimental new wave group
Flying Lotus – hip hop, IDM, jazz, electronica
Henry Flynt – violinist, guitarist, inventor of Electronic Hillbilly Music
David Fenech – musique concrète & experimental pop music
David First – drones and interference beats
John Frusciante – guitarist, Rock Musician, Electronica, Hip Hop, Avent-Garde
Cor Fuhler – improvising multi instrumentalist, composer, instrument builder
Ellen Fullman – long string Instrument
Diamanda Galás – vocalist, composer
Roopam Garg – guitarist, composer
Qubais Reed Ghazala – musician, composer, father of circuit-bending
Philip Glass – minimalism, composer
Percy Grainger – composer and performer
Bruce Haack – experimental electronic composer
Half Japanese – experimental indie rock
Richard D. James – experimental, ambient, electronic music, techno
The Hafler Trio
Lou Harrison – (USA) gamelan influenced
Carl Michael von Hausswolff
Joseph Haydn – composer
Pierre Henry – musique concrète
Lejaren Hiller – first computer composition Illiac Suite (1957) with Leonard Issacson
Susumu Hirasawa
Christopher Hobbs – experimental and systems music composer
Tim Hodgkinson – English experimental music composer and performer
Gustav Holst – English composer
Emily Howell – computer composer
The Hub – interactive real-time computer network: John Bischoff, Tim Perkis, Chris Brown, Phil Stone, Scot Gresham-Lancaster, Mark Trayle
I Set My Friends on Fire
Martín Irigoyen – guitar, prepared guitar, multi-instrumentalist, steampunk, composer
Charles Ives – quarter tones, tone clusters, aleatoric music, polyrhythm and polytonality
Don Joyce – sound collage
iwrestledabearonce
JPEGMAFIA – experimental hip-hop

K–P 

KK Null – noise rock
Kommissar Hjuler – cut-up collages
Anne La Berge – flute, improvisation, electronics, composition
André Éric Létourneau – gamelan, flute, composition, chance-operations, electronic music, microtonal music
George E. Lewis – trombone, composition, improvisation, electronic music, computer music
Steve Lieberman – American punk bassist, flutist called The Gangsta Rabbi
A Life of Science – Arizona based electronic band 
Lightning Bolt – noise rock
Franz Liszt – composer and performer
Annea Lockwood – environmental sounds
Alvin Lucier – (USA) acoustical phenomena
John Lydon – (UK) singer
The Mars Volta – rock band
Elio Martusciello – Italian experimental music composer and performer
Melvins – experimental
Meshuggah – extreme metal, experimental metal, progressive metal
Mama Baer – voice improvisation
Travis Miller - Experimental Artist
Miya Masaoka – composer and performer
Merzbow – (Japan) noise music
Moondog – composer
Gordon Mumma – live electronics
Muslimgauze – (UK)
Ben Neill – sound installations, mutantrumpet
Phill Niblock – minimal music composer
Nocturnal Emissions – (UK)
Nurse With Wound – (UK and Ireland) collaborative solo project of artist Steven Stapleton
Michael Nyman – (UK) composer and former critic and musicologist
Midori (band) – (Japan) four-member jazz-punk fusion band
The Observatory – Singapore-based art-rock band
Obsil – (ITA) composition, electronic music
Olivier Messiaen – (France) composer and organist.   
Pauline Oliveros – (USA) meditative music, just intonation, reverberant spaces, Expanded Instrument System
Oneohtrix Point Never - (USA) electronic music, ambient music, vaporwave
Yoko Ono – (UK, USA, Japan) happenings
Orange Monkey – (USA)
Ortiz Morales – (Spain) Experimental and noise music. Old kinematik synchronisms reconstructions.
John Oswald – (USA) plunderphonics
Nam June Paik – happenings, action music
Paul Panhuysen – string and other sound installations
Evan Parker – (UK) saxophonist
Harry Partch – (USA) microtonal composer
Portishead – Bristol
Henri Pousseur – (Belgium) self-described as "experimental"

Q–Z 

A.R. Rahman – (India) Film Music composer
Steve Reich – (USA) multimedia documentary opera
Hans Reichel – Free improvisation musician and inventor of electro-acoustic instruments
Renaldo and the Loaf – (UK)
Dino Residbegovic – (BiH) experimental/live-electronic contemporary music composer
The Residents – (USA)
Boyd Rice – (USA) noise music, ambient music
Terry Riley – (USA) multimedia minimalist composer
Ivette Román-Roberto – experimental vocalist
Cipriano de Rore – (Franco-Flemish) 
David Rosenboom – biofeedback (human)
Keith Rowe – British guitarist
Luigi Russolo – Futurism and noise music
Kristoffer Rygg – Frontman and main composer of Ulver
Erik Satie – precursor of minimalism, dada
Pierre Schaeffer – Musique concrète
Mathias Rehfeldt – experimental organist, composer
Giancarlo Schiaffini – Italian experimental music composer and performer
Elliott Sharp – multi-instrumentalist
Mark Stanley – guitarist, composer
Solage – composer
Sonic Youth – noise rock band
SOPHIE - experimental pop
Soul Coughing – improvisational jazz, hip hop, noise, and samples. 
Howard Stelzer – (USA)
Sunn O))) – drone metal band
Svoy – (USA, Russia) Universal Music Group producer/writer/artist, "...One of the most accomplished experimental electronic artists" —Timmy Kusnierek, Your EDM
Swans (band) – experimental rock, no wave
Toru Takemitsu – composer
James Tenney – alternate tunings, perceptual phenomena
They Might Be Giants – alternative rock, indie rock, experimental rock, children's music
Lynda Thomas – experimental musician and performer
Throbbing Gristle – industrial music, noise, shock lyrics
Edgard Varèse – electronic music
Michael Waller – contemporary music
Ween – psychedelic and lo-fi band that covers a multitude of genres
Xiu Xiu – experimental rock, noise pop, spoken word
Kathleen Yearwood – experimental, avant garde composer
La Monte Young – just intonation, minimalist, drone music
Richard Youngs – postmodern minimalist
Frank Zappa – composer and performer
Evan Ziporyn – (Bang on a Can), gamelan
John Zorn – postmodern, various genres
Zoviet France – British band

See also 
List of musicians by genre

References

Experimental